Elizabeth Plunkett  may refer to:

Elizabeth Gunning (translator), married name Elizabeth Plunkett, novelist and translator
Elizabeth Plunkett, Countess of Fingall, of the Irish nobility
Elizabeth Plunkett, 1976 victim of serial killers Geoffrey Evans and  John Shaw in Ireland

See also
Elizabeth Burke-Plunkett